The School of Health in Social Science at the University of Edinburgh is a department undertaking research and teaching into health, health policy and related fields. It is part of the College of Arts, Humanities and Social Sciences.

The school offers postgraduate degrees in Clinical Psychology, Counselling and Psychotherapy, Dementia, Health and Social Care and Nursing Studies, together with an undergraduate honours degree in Nursing (Bachelor of Nursing with Honours).

References

External links 
 

Schools of the University of Edinburgh
Medical education in Scotland
Health policy